Tyrone van Aswegen (born 6 January 1982) is a South African professional golfer who played on the PGA Tour.

Van Aswegen was born in Johannesburg, South Africa. He played in college at Oklahoma City University from 2000 to 2004, where he was a three-time NAIA All-American, led OCU to four NAIA team championships, and won seven times, including the 2002 individual national title.

Van Aswegen turned pro in 2004 after graduation, and began playing on the Sunshine Tour. He won twice on that tour in 2008, and finished a career-best seventh on the Order of Merit in 2009. He tied for 74th at the 2010 PGA Tour Qualifying Tournament, which gave him status for 2011 on the Web.com Tour (then known as the Nationwide Tour). After three seasons on the Web.com Tour, van Aswegen earned his PGA Tour card for the first time at the inaugural 2013 Web.com Tour Finals.

In his 2014 rookie season on the PGA Tour, van Aswegen finished 144th in the FedEx Cup and returned to the Web.com Tour Finals. He regained his card for 2015, but a poor season in which he finished 191st in the FedEx Cup necessitated another return to the Finals, through which he again regained his card.

His best finish on the PGA Tour was a T-3 at the 2015 Frys.com Open. His best finish on the Web.com Tour was a T-3 at the 2009 Soboba Classic.

Van Aswegen became a United States citizen in 2013.

Professional wins (3)

Sunshine Tour wins (2)

Sunshine Tour playoff record (0–2)

Other wins (1)

See also
2013 Web.com Tour Finals graduates
2014 Web.com Tour Finals graduates
2015 Web.com Tour Finals graduates

References

External links

Tyrone van Aswegen at the Sunshine Tour official site

South African male golfers
Oklahoma City Stars men's golfers
Sunshine Tour golfers
PGA Tour golfers
Korn Ferry Tour graduates
Golfers from Johannesburg
Golfers from Dallas
White South African people
1982 births
Living people